Thomas Chester was an Irish Anglican bishop in the penultimate decade of the sixteenth century (1580s). The son of William Chester Lord Mayor of London, he was Bishop of Elphin from 1580 until 1583.His elder brother was the first Chester baronet.

References

Anglican bishops of Elphin
Anglican clergy from London
16th-century Anglican bishops in Ireland